The Maidroid (lit. "The Kind Maid") is a 2015 South Korean comedy and pink film.

In 2015, this film premiered in Yubari International Fantastic Film Festival in Japan.

It is a Korean-style pink comedy film with science fiction gimmicks.

It is a story about a man fallen into his dream and his desire, love, and setbacks.

References

External links
 
 
 The Maidroid at IMDb

2015 films
2010s Korean-language films
South Korean comedy films
2010s South Korean films